Sreeja Ravi is an Indian voice artist who has lent her dubbing voice to over 2000 films in total and also performed voices for numerous commercial ads. She started her dubbing career in the year 1975 for the movie Uttarayanam, directed by G. Aravindan.  She is the winner of four time Kerala State Film Award, one Tamil Nadu State Film Award and two Kerala Film Critics Awards for dubbing.

Sreeja can speak Malayalam, Hindi, Tamil, Telugu, Bengali, English and also Kannada, as she used those six major Indian languages to perform dubbing roles in foreign productions.

Personal life
Sreeja was born to Kunjukuttan, who was a mechanical engineer and Kannur Narayani, who was a theater and dubbing artist. After her father's death in 1972, the family moved to Chennai. Her mother started working as a dubbing artist and has acted in a few movies and dramas. Sreeja used to go to studios with her mother and eventually started dubbing. She has eight siblings, out of which two are no more. Her siblings are Manomohan, Madanmohan, Sreedharan, Prakashbabu, Rasiklal, Jyothish Kumar, Dr Vijayalakshmi Rajan Singh and Premasudha Krishnankutty.

She is married to Raveendranathan. The couple has a daughter, Raveena Ravi, who is also a dubbing artist in Tamil, Malayalam, and Telugu.

Career

Acting
In starting of her career, she acted some films like Manassu (1973), Sethubandhanam (1974) & Raathriyile Yaathrakkaar (1976).

She appeared in a small role in Kandukonden Kandukonden (2000) as a programmer who is pregnant, with whom Tabu talks about the difficulties in finding a house.

She played the character of Cookeramma in Anoop Sathyan's Varane Aavashyamundu (2020) along with Shobhana, K.P.A.C. Lalitha, Dulquer Salman & Kalyani Priyadarshan. She also appeared in Jimmy Ee Veedinte Aiswaryam (2019).

Sreeja Ravi was introduced as a dialogue writer and was involved in the dubbing direction for the Tamil and Malayalam dubbed version of Shaakuntalam directed by Gunasekhar, where she did dub for Gautami and Aditi Balan in Tamil.

Dubbing career 

She started her dubbing career on films like Thambu and Uttarayanam as crowd voice. Then slowly started to give voice for child artists. Her first film for give voice to heroine was Ilaneer. But Kattathe Kilikkoodu was make her popular on Malayalam film industry. In it she dubbed for Revathi and Master Prashobh.

She mostly dubbed for actresses like Kavya Madhavan, Divya Unni, Shalini, Gopika, Devayani, Sunitha, Charmila and Nayanthara, Roma.

Malayalam

Tamil 
This list is incomplete.

Ravi works as a voice actress in Telugu, Kannada & Bollywood industries, apart from the Malayalam & Tamil film industries.

Dialogues or effects between songs

Filmography as Actress

Malayalam

Tamil

TV serials and ads 
Dubbing

Ads

Awards

Award for best dubbing artist

See also
List of Indian Dubbing Artists
Raveena Ravi
Kerala State Film Award for Best Dubbing Artist
Tamil Nadu State Film Award for Best Female Dubbing Artist

References

Notes
'എനിക്കിനിയൊരു സ്വാഭാവിക ജീവിതം ഉണ്ടാകില്ലെന്ന് ന്യൂറോ സര്‍ജന്‍ അന്ന് വിധിയെഴുതി'; ശ്രീജ പറയുന്നു
ഈ ശബ്ദം കാവ്യ മാധവന്‍റേയോ ദിവ്യ ഉണ്ണിയുടെയോ, അതോ...; പ്രേക്ഷകരെ കണ്‍ഫ്യൂഷനാക്കിയ 'കുക്കറമ്മ' ആര്?
Petromax World Television Premiere Tamil Comedy Horror Film On TV
ഈ ശബ്ദം കാവ്യ മാധവന്‍റേയോ ദിവ്യ ഉണ്ണിയുടെയോ, അതോ...; പ്രേക്ഷകരെ കണ്‍ഫ്യൂഷനാക്കിയ 'കുക്കറമ്മ' ആര്?
‘അത് കാവ്യ മാധവന്റെ ശബ്ദമല്ലേ’: പ്രേക്ഷകരെ സംശയത്തിലാഴ്ത്തിയ ‘കുക്കറമ്മ’ ആരെന്നോ?

https://www.mathrubhumi.com/women/features/dubbing-artist-sreeja-ravi-share-her-experience-on-working-in-film-industry-1.4963053
https://malayalam.samayam.com/malayalam-cinema/movie-news/facebook-post-about-dubbing-artist-sreeja-ravi-who-acted-in-varane-avashyamund-goes-viral/articleshow/74023294.cms

Indian voice actresses
Living people
Actresses from Chennai
Kerala State Film Award winners
Actresses in Tamil cinema
Actresses in Malayalam cinema
Indian film actresses
21st-century Indian actresses
20th-century Indian actresses
Year of birth missing (living people)